Vigen Chitechyan (26 July 1941 – 6 October 2021) was an Armenian politician and diplomat. He held ambassadorships in France, Belgium, the European Union, the Netherlands, Luxembourg, Andorra, Monaco, and the Holy See.

Awards
Mkhitar Gosh Medal (2001)
Croix de guerre of Belgium (2009)
Ordre national du Mérite (2011)

References

1941 births
2021 deaths
Diplomats from Yerevan
Armenian politicians
Armenian diplomats
Ambassadors of Armenia to France
Ambassadors of Armenia to Belgium
Ambassadors of Armenia to the European Union
Ambassadors of Armenia to the Netherlands
Ambassadors of Armenia to Luxembourg
Ambassadors of Armenia to Andorra
Ambassadors of Armenia to Monaco
Ambassadors of Armenia to the Holy See
Recipients of the Ordre national du Mérite
Recipients of the Croix de guerre (Belgium)